Siege of Lingen may refer to:

 Siege of Lingen (1597)
 Siege of Lingen (1605)